Matthew Charles Labyorteaux (born December 8, 1966) is an American film, television and voice actor. In many of his credits, his last name is spelled as "Laborteaux". He is also credited as Matthew Charles for his work in animation.

He is best known for portraying Albert Ingalls on Little House on the Prairie from 1978 to 1983. He is also known as the voice of Jaden Yuki and The Supreme King in Yu-Gi-Oh! GX from 2005 to 2008.

Early life
Labyorteaux was born in Los Angeles and adopted by interior designer and talent agent Ronald Labyorteaux (1930–92) and actress Frances Marshall, born Frances Newman (1927–2012). He is the younger brother of Patrick, also adopted and also an actor, and Jane. An article in People magazine from 1978 reported that he was born with a hole in his heart, and was thought to be autistic for the first five years of his life.

Career

Labyorteaux began working in commercials at the age of seven, having been discovered while accompanying his older brother, Patrick Labyorteaux, to a casting call. He shortly thereafter landed his first dramatic role in A Woman Under the Influence, directed and written by John Cassavetes, where he played one of the children of Peter Falk's and Gena Rowlands's characters.

Aside from his tenure on Little House on the Prairie, Labyorteaux also starred in the short-lived television series The Red Hand Gang (1977) and Whiz Kids (1983–1984), in addition to several made-for-television movies. His most prominent film role was in Wes Craven's Deadly Friend (1986) as Paul Conway, a young genius who resurrects a dead girl using an artificial intelligence microchip from a robot he created that had previously been destroyed by a malicious neighbor.

He made guest appearances on numerous television shows, including The Rookies, The Bob Newhart Show, Mulligan's Stew, Lou Grant, Here's Boomer (spin-off of The Red Hand Gang), The Love Boat, Simon & Simon (crossover episode with Whiz Kids), Highway to Heaven, Night Court, Paradise, and Silk Stalkings.

More recently, Labyorteaux has worked as a voice actor, providing characterizations in video games and animated features, additional dialogue recording in film and television, and voice-over in advertisements.

Personal life
Labyorteaux is a skilled video game player. In October 1981, he finished in 10th place for Centipede at the Atari, Inc. world championships. In April 1982, he became the United States Pac-Man champion at a People-sponsored tournament, with a score of 1,200,000.

In 1992, Matthew and Patrick founded the Youth Rescue Fund (which was partnered with Los Angeles Youth Supportive Services), a charity organization that assists young people in crisis, and have since engaged in fundraising for youth shelters across the U.S. The organization is no longer active.

On July 17, 2020, Labyorteaux married his wife Leslie. Matthew is the stepfather to Leslie's 2 kids.

Filmography

Film
{|class="wikitable sortable"
 |-
 ! Year !! Title !! Role !!class="unsortable"|Notes
 |-
 | 1974
 | A Woman Under the Influence
 | Angelo Longhetti
 |
 |-
 | 1978
 | King of the Gypsies
 | Middle Dave
 |
 |-
 | 1986
 | Deadly Friend
 | Paul Conway
 |
 |-
 | 1998
 | Mulan
 |rowspan="3"| Additional voices
 |
 |-
 | 2006
 | Everyone's Hero
 |
 |-
 | 2009
 | Bride Wars 
 |
 |-
 | 2011
 | Yu-Gi-Oh!: Bonds Beyond Time 
 | Jaden Yuki (voice)
 | English dub
 |-
 | 2013
 | The Wind Rises
 |rowspan="2"| Additional voices
 | English dub
 |-
 | 2018
 | Next Gen
 |
|}

Television

Video games

Accolades
{| class="wikitable sortable"
 |-
 ! Year !! Association !! Category !! Show !! Result
 |-
 | 1983
 |rowspan=3| Young Artist Awards
 | Best Young Actor in a Drama Series
 | Little House on the Prairie
 | 
 |-
 |rowspan=2| 1984
 | Best Young Actor in a New Television Series
 | Whiz Kids
 | 
 |-
 | Best Young Actor in a Drama Series
 | Little House on the Prairie
 | 
|}

References

External links

 
 
 
 

1966 births
20th-century American male actors
21st-century American male actors
American adoptees
American male child actors
American male film actors
American male television actors
American male voice actors
American people of French-Canadian descent
Living people
Male actors from Los Angeles